In the mathematical study of differential equations, the Dirichlet (or first-type) boundary condition is a type of boundary condition, named after Peter Gustav Lejeune Dirichlet (1805–1859). When imposed on an ordinary or a partial differential equation, it specifies the values that a solution needs to take along the boundary of the domain.

In finite element method (FEM) analysis, essential or Dirichlet boundary condition is defined by weighted-integral form of a differential equation. The dependent unknown u in the same form as the weight function w appearing in the boundary expression is termed a primary variable, and its specification constitutes the essential or Dirichlet boundary condition. 

The question of finding solutions to such equations is known as the Dirichlet problem. In applied sciences, a Dirichlet boundary condition may also be referred to as a fixed boundary condition.

Examples

ODE
For an ordinary differential equation, for instance,  the Dirichlet boundary conditions on the interval  take the form

PDE
For a partial differential equation, for example,  where  denotes the Laplace operator, the Dirichlet boundary conditions on a domain  take the form

where  is a known function defined on the boundary .

Applications

For example, the following would be considered Dirichlet boundary conditions:
 In mechanical engineering and civil engineering (beam theory), where one end of a beam is held at a fixed position in space.
 In thermodynamics, where a surface is held at a fixed temperature.
 In electrostatics, where a node of a circuit is held at a fixed voltage.
 In fluid dynamics, the no-slip condition for viscous fluids states that at a solid boundary, the fluid will have zero velocity relative to the boundary.

Other boundary conditions

Many other boundary conditions are possible, including the Cauchy boundary condition and the mixed boundary condition. The latter is a combination of the Dirichlet and Neumann conditions.

See also
Neumann boundary condition
Robin boundary condition
Boundary conditions in fluid dynamics

References

Boundary conditions